This is a list of winners for the Sundance Film Festival Directing Award for dramatic features.

Winners

1990s
1998: Pi - Darren Aronofsky
1999: Judy Berlin

2000s
2000: Girlfight
2001: Hedwig and the Angry Inch - John Cameron Mitchell
2002: Tadpole
2003: Thirteen - Catherine Hardwicke
2004: Down to the Bone - Debra Granik
2005: The Squid and the Whale - Noah Baumbach
2006: A Guide to Recognizing Your Saints
2007: Rocket Science
2008: Ballast
2009: Sin Nombre

2010s
2010: 3 Backyards
2011: Martha Marcy May Marlene
2012: Middle of Nowhere - Ava DuVernay
2013: Afternoon Delight
2014: Fishing Without Nets
2015: The Witch - Robert Eggers
2016: Swiss Army Man - Daniels
2017: Beach Rats
2018: The Kindergarten Teacher
2019: The Last Black Man in San Francisco - Joe Talbot

2020s
2020: The 40-Year-Old Version - Radha Blank
2021: CODA - Sian Heder
2022: Palm Trees and Power Lines
2023:The Accidental Getaway Driver - Sing J. Lee

References

See also
Academy Award for Best Director

Sundance Film Festival
Awards established in 1998
Awards for best director